Shernaz Patel is an Indian film and theatre actor, who works in Hindi and English films, most known for her roles in films like Black (2005) and Guzaarish (2010) and English language theatre in Mumbai. She made her theatre debut with The Diary Of Anne Frank in 1984. Since then, she has acted in several noted productions in Mumbai-based English theatre, and formed RAGE theatre group in Mumbai, with Rahul da Cunha and Rajit Kapur in 1993. She has also given voice to the character of Yashoda in the TV series Little Krishna.

Early life and education
Born in Mumbai, Shernaz is the daughter of Gujarati stage veterans Ruby and Burjor Patel and grew up in a theatre environment. She did her schooling at Fort Covent school, where she participated in plays directed by Pearl Padamsee. She graduated from the Elphinstone College, University of Mumbai. Subsequently, she did her master's degree in acting from the Royal Scottish Academy of Music and Drama.

Career
She made her film debut with Mahesh Bhatt's TV film Janam (1986) alongside Kumar Gaurav. In 1992, she performed the lead in the English play, Love Letters for the first time, along with Rajit Kapoor, under the direction of Rahul da Cunha. The play is still being performed.

In 2008 she returned to soap operas after 23 years of filming in various movies.

In 2009, she acted in screenwriter and Mira Nair's long-time collaborator Sooni Taraporevala's directorial debut film, Little Zizou. In 2011 she appeared in Rockstar. In 2012, she appeared in Reema Kagti's suspense-drama Talaash.

In 2014 she performed at the Times Noida festival along with other actors such as Rajit Kapur and Neil Bhoopalam.

In 2015 she acted in a YouTube mini-series by YashRaj Films called "Bang Baaja Baaraat" along with Ali Fazal, Angira Dhar, Gajraj Rao, Rajit Kapur, Ayesha Raza, Neil Bhoopalam, Preetika Chawla and Priyanshu Painyuli.

In 2016 she was seen in season finale of TVF Tripling, portraying the role of mother of the siblings.

Filmography
Khandaan (1985)
Janam (1986)
Black (2005)
Home Delivery (2005)
Family — Ties of Blood (2006)
Humko Deewana Kar Gaye (2006)
Dum Kaata (2007)
Big Brother (2007)
Dhan Dhana Dhan Goal (2007)
Little Zizou (2009)
The President Is Coming (2009)
Kalpavriksha
Hum Tum Aur Ghost (2010)
Lamhaa (2010)
Guzaarish (2010)
O Maria ( 2010)
I Am (2011)
Rockstar (2011)
Love, Wrinkle-free (2012) 
Talaash (2012) – Frenny
Gandhi of the Month (2012) Post-production
Kalpvriksh (2012)
Aatma (2013)
 John Day (2013)
 Gandhi of the Month (2014)
Roy (2015)
Azhar (2016)
The Black Cat (2017)

Dubbing roles

Live action films

Animated films

Television/Web series

Awards
2011 Star Screen Award for Best Supporting Actress – Guzaarish

References

External links
 
 

Indian film actresses
Actresses in Hindi cinema
Indian stage actresses
Living people
University of Mumbai alumni
Alumni of the Royal Conservatoire of Scotland
Actresses from Mumbai
21st-century Indian actresses
20th-century Indian actresses
Year of birth missing (living people)
Parsi people from Mumbai
Screen Awards winners